Love Amongst War is a Chinese historical television series about the life of Xue Pinggui, a legendary hero in Chinese folklore, and based on the events in the Xiantong era of Emperor Yizong of the Tang dynasty. The series was written and produced by Jian Yuanxin, and directed by Lin Tianyi. The series stars Benny Chan, Jessica Hsuan, and Angel Lou.

Cast
 Benny Chan as Emperor Xuānzong of Tang/ Xue Pinggui.
 Jessica Hsuan as Wang Baochuan, the third daughter of Prime Minister, Xue Pinggui's wife, Empress of Tang Dynasty.
 Angel Lou as Dai Zhan, the Princess of Xiliang Kingdom, Xue Pinggui's concubine.

Other
 Yumiko Cheng as Xue Pinggui's mother, a concubine of Emperor Xuānzong of Tang.
 Monica Mu as Concubine Yu, a concubine of Emperor Xuānzong of Tang.
 Hong Zhongyi as Wang Yun, Wang Baochuan's father, the Prime Minister of Tang Dynasty.
 Xue Shujie as Wang Baochuan's mother.
 Zhang Yongqi as Wang Jinchuan, the eldest daughter of Prime Minister Wang, Xue Baochuan's sister.
 Chen Yizhen as Wang Yinchuan, the second daughter of Prime Minister Wang, Xue Baochuan's sister.
 Zhang Di as Su Long, Wang Jinchuan's husband, the son-in-law of Prime Minister Wang.
 Lou Yajiang as Wei Hu, Wang Yinchuan's wife, the son-in-law of Prime Minister Wang.
 Candy Tu as Xue Qi, Xue Pinggui's sworn sister.
 Chen Weimin as Ge Da, Xue Pinggui's sworn brother.
 Zhang Liang as Wei Bao, Xue Qi's husband.
 Zhou Danli as Xiao Lian, Wang Baochuan's servant girl.
 Zhao Xi as the King of Xiliang Kingdom.
 Tai-Feng Hsia as the Empress of Xiliang Kingdom.
 Ye Zuxin as Ye Xing, the eunuch who saved Xue Pinggui.
 Xin Zi as princess Dai Zhan, daughter of the Empress of Xiliang Kingdom.
 Yuan Xin Ran as Li Na, princess Dai Zhan's servant girl.

Release
It was a hit TV drama in Mainland China and Taiwan.

Critical response
The series received mixed reviews.

References

2012 Chinese television series debuts
Television series set in the Tang dynasty
Chinese historical television series